The Roman Catholic Diocese of Urdaneta (Latin: Dioecesis Urdanetensis) is a Roman Rite diocese of the Latin Church of the Catholic Church in the Philippines. The diocese was established in 1985 from the Archdiocese of Lingayen-Dagupan.

Ordinaries
Pedro de Guzman Magugat, DD: April 22, 1985 - May 5, 1990) 
Jesús Castro Galang, DD: December 7, 1991 - September 6, 2004
Jacinto Agcaoili José, DD: Sep 21, 2005–present

Affiliated Bishop/s from the Diocese of Urdaneta
Marlo Mendoza Peralta, DD, current archbishop of Nueva Segovia and former bishop of the Diocese of Alaminos from 2007 to 2014. He was one of the clergies of the Diocese of Urdaneta for thirty years.

Educational institutions
 Divine Word College of Urdaneta - Urdaneta City
 Escuela de San Antonio - Rosales
 Holy Child Academy - Binalonan
 Holy Rood Academy - Alcala
 Immaculate Conception Catholic School - Umingan
 Mary Help of Christians Learning Center - Pozzorubio
 Our Lady of Mt. Carmel Academy - Sison
 Our Lady of the Lilies Academy - Urdaneta City
 Our Lady of the Pillar Catholic School - Sta. Maria
 St. Anthony Abbot Academy - Villasis
 St. Mary's Dominican School - San Manuel
 St. Paschal Catholic School - San Quintin
 St. Patrick Catholic School, Inc - Tayug
 St. Philomena's Academy - Pozorrubio
 St. Louis Bertrand School, Inc. - Asingan

See also
Catholic Church in the Philippines
List of Catholic dioceses in the Philippines

References

Urdaneta
Urdaneta
Christian organizations established in 1985
Roman Catholic dioceses and prelatures established in the 20th century
Religion in Pangasinan
Urdaneta, Pangasinan
1985 establishments in the Philippines